Rinkeby-Kista is a borough (stadsdelsområde) in Stockholm, Sweden. The borough is located in Västerort.

Overview
The districts that make up the borough are Akalla, Husby, Kista, and Rinkeby. The population of Rinkeby-Kista borough is 48,604 as of December 2015.

The borough was formed on January 1, 2007 when Kista borough and Rinkeby borough were merged.

References

External links

Boroughs of Stockholm
Västerort